The following outline is provided as an overview of and topical guide to the U.S. state of Florida:

Florida – third most populous and the southeasternmost of the 50 states of the United States of America. Florida lies between the Gulf of Mexico and the North Atlantic Ocean. The Territory of Florida joined the Union as the 27th state on March 3, 1845. Florida joined the Confederate States of America during the American Civil War from 1861 to 1865, but was readmitted to the Union in 1868.

General reference

 Names
 Common name: Florida
 Pronunciation: 
 Official name: State of Florida
 Abbreviations and name codes
 Postal symbol:  FL
 ISO 3166-2 code: US-FL
 Internet second-level domain: .fl.us
 Nicknames
 Sunshine State (currently used on license plates)
 Others include:
 Alligator State
 Everglade State
 Flower State
 God's Waiting Room
 Gulf State
 La Florida
 Orange State
 Peninsula State or Peninsular State

 Adjectival: Florida
 Demonym:  Floridian

Geography of Florida

Geography of Florida
 Florida is: a U.S. state, a federal state of the United States of America
 Location
 Northern hemisphere
 Western hemisphere
 Americas
 North America
 Anglo America
 Northern America
 United States of America
 Contiguous United States
 Eastern United States
 East Coast of the United States
 South Atlantic States
 Southeastern United States
 Southern United States
 Deep South
 Gulf Coast of the United States
 Population of Florida: 18,801,310 (2010 U.S. Census)
 Area of Florida
 Atlas of Florida

Places in Florida

Places in Florida
 Historic places in Florida
 Ghost towns in Florida
 National Historic Landmarks in Florida
 National Register of Historic Places listings in Florida
 Bridges on the National Register of Historic Places in Florida
 National Natural Landmarks in Florida
 National parks in Florida
 Everglades National Park
 Dry Tortugas National Park
 Biscayne National Park
 State parks in Florida

Environment of Florida

Environment of Florida
 Climate of Florida
 Geology of Florida
 Protected areas in Florida
 State forests of Florida
 Superfund sites in Florida
 Wildlife of Florida
 Flora of Florida
Endemic
Florida mangroves
List of invasive plant species in Florida
Orchids
Trees 
 Fauna of Florida
 Birds of Florida
 Mammals of Florida
 Reptiles of Florida

Natural geographic features of Florida

 Highest points of Florida
 Islands of Florida
 Rivers of Florida

Regions of Florida

 Central Florida
 Eastern Florida
 Southern Florida
 Southwestern Florida
 Western Florida

Administrative divisions of Florida

 The 67 counties of the state of Florida
 Municipalities in Florida
 Cities in Florida
 State capital of Florida: Tallahassee
 City nicknames in Florida
 Sister cities in Florida
 Towns in Florida

Demography of Florida

Demographics of Florida

Government and politics of Florida

Politics of Florida
 Form of government: U.S. state government
 United States congressional delegations from Florida
 Florida State Capitol
 Elections in Florida
 Electoral reform in Florida
 Political party strength in Florida
 Florida and the Declaration of Independence

Branches of the government of Florida

Government of Florida

Executive branch of the government of Florida
Governor of Florida
Lieutenant Governor of Florida
 Secretary of State of Florida
 State Treasurer of Florida
 State departments
 Florida Department of Transportation

Legislative branch of the government of Florida

 Florida Legislature (bicameral)
 Upper house: Florida Senate
 Lower house: Florida House of Representatives

Judicial branch of the government of Florida

Courts of Florida
 Supreme Court of Florida

Law and order in Florida

Law of Florida
 Capital punishment in Florida
 Individuals executed in Florida
 Constitution of Florida
 Crime in Florida
 Gun laws in Florida
 Law enforcement in Florida
 Law enforcement agencies in Florida
 Same-sex marriage in Florida

Military in Florida

 Florida Air National Guard
 Florida Army National Guard

History of Florida

History of Florida

History of Florida, by period 

Prehistory of Florida
Indigenous people of the Everglades region
Maritime history of Florida since 1513
On Easter Sunday, April 2, 1513, a Spanish expedition led by Juan Ponce de León lands on a huge inhabited island (later determined to be a continental peninsula) that he names for Pascua Florida (the Land of Flowers, now Florida).
Spanish settlement of Ochuse, 1559–1560
A Spanish expedition led by Tristán de Luna y Arellano establishes a settlement at Santa Maria de Ochuse (Pensacola, Florida) on August 15, 1559.
A hurricane destroys most of the Ochuse settlement five weeks later on September 19, 1559.
French colony of Caroline, 1564–1565
Jean Ribault explores the Atlantic coast of Florida for France in 1562.
French Huguenots led by René Goulaine de Laudonnière establish Fort de la Caroline on June 22, 1564
Spanish Governor Pedro Menéndez de Avilés captures Fort de la Caroline on September 20, 1565
Governor Menéndez orders the execution of 140 Huguenots from Fort de la Caroline on September 29, 1565
Governor Menéndez orders the execution of Jean Ribault and 350 shipwrecked Huguenots on October 12, 1565
Spanish territory of Florida, 1565–1763
Spanish Governor Pedro Menéndez de Avilés establishes settlement at San Agustín (Saint Augustine) on September 8, 1565
Governor Menéndez orders captured Fort de la Caroline rebuilt as Fuerte San Mateo on September 29, 1565
French raiders led by Dominique de Gourgues destroy Fuerte San Mateo and murder all its defenders on April 27–28, 1567
Treaty of Paris of 1763
British Colony of East Florida, 1763–1783
British Colony of West Florida, 1763–1783
Treaty of Paris of 1783
Spanish province of Florida Oriental, 1783–1821
Spanish province of Florida Occidental, 1783–1821
Treaty of San Lorenzo of 1795
Republic of West Florida, 1810
First Seminole War, 1817–1818
Adams–Onís Treaty of 1819
Territory of Florida, 1822–1845
Trail of Tears, 1830–1838
Second Seminole War, 1835–1842
State of Florida becomes 27th state admitted to the United States of America on March 3, 1845
Mexican–American War, April 25, 1846 – February 2, 1848
American Civil War, April 12, 1861 – May 13, 1865
Third state to declare secession from the United States of America on January 10, 1861
Founding state of the Confederate States of America on February 8, 1861
Florida in the American Civil War
Florida in Reconstruction, 1865–1868
Third former Confederate state readmitted to the United States of America on June 25, 1868
Compromise of 1877 removes final U.S. military forces from the former Confederate states
Everglades National Park established on December 6, 1947
Biscayne National Park established on June 28, 1980
Dry Tortugas National Park established on October 26, 1992

History of Florida, by region 
 Counties
 Brevard
 Leon
 Cities
 Fort Lauderdale
 Jacksonville
 Miami
 Pensacola
 Tallahassee
 Tampa

History of Florida, by subject 
 Maritime history of Florida
 History of universities in Florida
 Florida State University
 University of Florida

Culture of Florida

Culture of Florida
 Museums in Florida
 Religion in Florida
 Catholic Church - largest single denomination in Florida
 The Church of Jesus Christ of Latter-day Saints in Florida
 Episcopal Diocese of Florida
 Scouting in Florida
 State symbols of Florida
 Flag of the State of Florida 
 Great Seal of the State of Florida

The arts in Florida
 Music of Florida

Sports in Florida

Sports in Florida
 Professional sports teams in Florida

Economy and infrastructure of Florida

Economy of Florida

 Communications in Florida
 Newspapers in Florida
 Radio stations in Florida
 Television stations in Florida
 Health care in Florida
 Hospitals in Florida
 Transportation in Florida
 Airports in Florida
 Roads in Florida
 Interstate Highways
 State highways
 Toll Roads
 U.S. Highways

Education in Florida

Education in Florida
 Schools in Florida
 School districts in Florida
 High schools in Florida
 Colleges and universities in Florida
 Florida State University
 University of Florida

See also

Topic overview:
Florida

Index of Florida-related articles

References

External links

Florida
Florida